EQ Media Group, formerly Essential Media Group (EMG),  is a global television production company with production and development hubs in Los Angeles, California; Sydney, Australia; Auckland, New Zealand; and Vancouver, Canada.

History
EMG was formed in 2016 with the full merger of Quail Entertainment US, Australia’s Essential Media & Entertainment, Essential Quail Television (EQTV), and Los Angeles-based 11 Television. Toronto’s Kew Media acquired the company in July 2018, but in March 2020, the company was bought out by EMG CEO Greg Quail and North American president Jesse Fawcett, after the collapse of Kew Media.

It was rebranded to EQ Media Group in August 2020.

Description
EQ Media Group is a global television production company with production and development hubs in Los Angeles, Sydney, Auckland, and Vancouver.

Selected awards and nominations

 Golden Gate Award - San Francisco International Film Festival
 Silver Plaques - Chicago International Film Festival
 Cine Golden Eagle Award
 UN Media Peace Prizes 
 Selected for Joris Ivens Award Competition at IDFA 
 Human Rights Awards
 Banff Rocky Award Nominations (
 ATOM Awards 
 Best Documentary, Film Critics Circle
 AFI Best Documentary Award
 AFI Best Documentary Nominations and numerous craft awards
 Logie Award for Most Outstanding Doc Series (and other nominations)
 Dendy Best Documentary Award and Nominations, Sydney Film Festival
 Walkley Award for Excellence in Journalism

Programming

Non-scripted

 No Demo Reno (2021)
 Selling the Big Easy (2021)
 Texas FlipnMove (2013-2019)
 Restored (2013-2021)
 Mom and Me (2018)
 Ghost Loop' (2017)
 Ivan Milat: Buried Secrets (2021)
 After the Night (2021)
 This Could Go Anywhere (2020)
 Outback Lockdown (2020)
 Rhys Darby: Big in Japan (2020)
 Koala Rescue (2020)
 Cook Like An Italian (2020)
 Griff's Great Kiwi Road Trip (2019)
 The Pacific: In the Wake of Captain Cook, with Sam Neill (2018)
 Body Hack" (2016-2021)
 The Grammar of Happiness (2011)
 Seduction in the City (2011)
 A Traveler's Guide to the Planets (2010)
 Miracles (2010)
 The Pharaoh Who Conquered the Sea (2010)
 The Making of Modern Australia (2010)
 Gourmet Farmer (2010)
 Whatever! The Science of Teens (2009)
 Lush House (2009)
 Solo (2008)
 Connected: The Power of Six Degrees (2008)
 Rodney's Robot Revolution (2008)
 The Hobbit Enigma (2008)
 Rogue Nation (2008)
 Miracle on Everest (2008)
 Never Say Die Matildas (2008)
 Indonesia: A Reporter's Journey (2008)
 The Choir (2007)
 Songlines to the Seine (2007)
 Policing the Pacific (2007)
 The Catalpa Rescue (2007)
 Is Your House Killing You? (2007)
 Ten Pound Poms (2007)
 In the Line of Fire (2007)
 Neil Perry's High Steaks (2006)
 Johnny Warren's Football Mission (2006)
 The Floating Brothel (2006)
 Heat in the Kitchen (2005)

Scripted

 Under The Vines 2021 (with Libertine Films)
 Troppo 2021 (with Beyond Productions)
 At Home With Julia (2013)
 Wednesday Night Fever (2014)
 Rake (2010)
 Jack Irish (2011)
 The Last Confession of Alexander Pearce (2008)
 Scorched (2008)

References

External links
 

Television production companies